What's His Name? is the debut album by Keith Frank and the Soileau Zydeco Band. It was released in 1994. The title track was a minor hit.

Critical reception

The Washington Post wrote that Frank "emphasizes the kind of hypnotic two-step stomps popularized by Beau Jocque and Boozoo Chavis."

Track listing
All songs written by Keith Frank except when noted.

"What's His Name?" – 3:15
"Silly Puddin" – 3:30
"Motor Dude Special" – 5:13 (Boozoo Chavis)
"Feels So Bad" – 5:41 (Little Milton)
"One Shot" – 3:58
"Dr. Jim" – 2:29
"Get on Boy" – 4:32
"Rainbow" – 5:41 (Curtis Mayfield)
"Mr. Frank" – 2:43
"On the Rise" – 3:09
"Sweet Pea" – 3:50
"Murdock (Zydeco Heehaw)" – 3:37 (Boozoo Chavis)
"Everybody Get Up!" – 4:08
"At the Trail Ride" – 2:54

Credits
Keith Frank – accordion, vocals
Jennifer Frank – bass guitar, backing vocals
Brad Paul Frank – drums
George Attale – guitar
Nathaniel Fontenot - guitar
James "Chocolate" Ned – vest frottoir (rub board)

References

1994 albums
Keith Frank albums